The 2022–23 Indiana State Sycamores men's basketball team represents Indiana State University in the 2022–23 NCAA Division I men's basketball season. The Sycamores, led by second-year head coach Josh Schertz, play their home games at the Hulman Center in Terre Haute, Indiana as members of the Missouri Valley Conference.

The Fightin' Trees reached the ArchMadness Semi-finals for their best finish since the 2020-21 season.  Senior guard Cooper Neese was named to the All-ArchMadness team; Neese scored 63 points for the Tourney, raising his career ArchMadness scoring total to 84 points (10.5 ppg, 8 games).  Courvoisier McCauley was named MVC Newcomer of the Year. McCauley also made the All-Conference Second Team and All-Newcomer Team.

McCauley is the third Sycamore all-time to be named MVC Newcomer of the Year; earlier Sycamore honorees are John Sherman Williams (1983) and Eddie Bird (1988). Other Sycamores who received MVC honors include: Cameron Henry (All-Conference Third Team), Robbie Avila (All-Freshman Team), and Julian Larry (All-Defensive Team).

Previous season
The Sycamores finished the 2021–22 season 11–20, 4–14 in MVC play to finish in ninth place. They lost to Illinois State in the opening round of the MVC tournament.

Roster

Schedule and results

|-
!colspan=12 style=| Exhibition

|-
!colspan=12 style=| Regular season

|-
!colspan=12 style=| MVC Tournament

|-
!colspan=12 style=| College Basketball Invitational

Sources

References

Indiana State Sycamores men's basketball seasons
Indiana State
Indiana State
Indiana State Sycamores men's basketball
Indiana State Sycamores men's basketball